Forest Park is a city in Clayton County, Georgia, United States. It is located approximately nine miles (14 km) south of Atlanta and is part of the Atlanta–Sandy Springs–Marietta Metropolitan Statistical Area. As of the 2020 census, the city had a population of 19,932.

History
Originally the third stop from Atlanta on the Macon and Western Railroad, the city was incorporated in 1908. The community was named for the parklike setting of the original town site. The  Fort Gillem was founded nearby in 1941 and was annexed into the city in 1973.

Geography

Demographics

2020 census

As of the 2020 United States census, there were 19,932 people, 6,618 households, and 4,038 families residing in the city.

2010 census
As of the census of 2010, there were 18,468	 people, 6,877 households, and 4,839 families residing in the city. The racial makeup of the city was 19.2% White, 37.7% African American, 0.50% Native American, 7.9% Asian, 0.01% Pacific Islander, Hispanic or Latino of any race were 34.3% of the population.

There were 6,845 households, out of which 37.0% had children under the age of 18 living with them, 40.0% were married couples living together, 22.5% had a female householder with no husband present, and 29.3% were non-families. 22.5% of all households were made up of individuals, and 7.3% had someone living alone who was 65 years of age or older.  The average household size was 2.98 and the average family size was 3.42.

In the city, the population was spread out, with 28.1% under the age of 18, 13.9% from 18 to 24, 33.6% from 25 to 44, 16.0% from 45 to 64, and 8.7% who were 65 years of age or older.  The median age was 29 years. For every 100 females, there were 105.9 males.  For every 100 females age 18 and over, there were 105.9 males.

The median income for a household in the city was $33,556, and the median income for a family was $36,029. Males had a median income of $27,381 versus $23,104 for females. The per capita income for the city was $13,778.  About 12.0% of families and 30.5% of the population were below the poverty line, including 20.6% of those under age 18 and 9.3% of those age 65 or over.

Education
Public education in the city of Forest Park is provided by Clayton County Public Schools. Schools in the Forest Park area include four elementary schools, two middles schools and one high school.

Elementary schools
Hendrix Drive Elementary,
Fountain Elementary,
Edmonds Elementary, and 
Huie Elementary.

Middle schools
Babb Middle School,
Forest Park Middle School

High school
Forest Park High School

Transportation

Air
Hartsfield-Jackson Atlanta International Airport

Highways

  Interstate 75
  Interstate 285
  U.S. Route 19
  U.S. Route 41
  State Route 3
  State Route 54
  State Route 331
  State Route 401 (unsigned designation for I-75)
  State Route 407 (unsigned designation for I-285)

Transit systems
MARTA serves the city.

There is commuter rail service in the planning stages along the Norfolk Southern line, with proposed stations in Forest Park, Morrow, Jonesboro, and initially ending at Lovejoy.

Notable people
 General Philip M. Breedlove, Commander, U.S. European Command
 Russel L. Honoré, retired Lieutenant General and former Commander of Joint Task Force Katrina
 Cindy Schreyer, professional golfer and NCAA women's champion
 Terrell Starr, Georgia State Senate
 Roscoe Thompson, retired NASCAR Cup Series driver
 Hines Ward, NFL wide receiver of the Pittsburgh Steelers
 Lil Keed, Rapper
 Lil Gotit, Rapper

See also
 Fort Gillem
 Morris Army Airfield

References

External links
City of Forest Park, Georgia - Official site.
"Municipality Statistics by Race and Gender," Georgia Secretary of State

Cities in Georgia (U.S. state)
Cities in Clayton County, Georgia